Two Bullfinch-class destroyers served with the British Royal Navy;  and  were both built by Earle's Shipbuilding company in Hull in 1898. They were 210 feet long, generated 5,800 HP and carried a full complement of 63 officers and men. They were distinguished from other similar C-class ships by their flat-sided centre funnels and conspicuous steam pipes. They were armed with the standard twelve-pounder and two torpedo tubes, and served through the Great War, being broken up after the end of hostilities.

See also

References

 
Destroyer classes
Ship classes of the Royal Navy